Petar Bazic (Serbian: Петар Базић) is a licensed FIFA agent and former Serbian footballer.

Playing career

Bazic tried out for Penang FA in late 2005 on the advise of fellow Serbian Saša Branežac and was registered on the last day of the transfer window. A muscle injury constraint preventing him from making his debut against Malacca Telekom, the Serbian scored off a corner during his real debut versus Negeri Sembilan FA in the 30th minute, ending the game 1–0.

Finishing his playing career in Malaysia, Bazic received his FIFA mediator license and became an official FIFA agent.

References

External links
 Bazic: You’ve not seen the best of me yet

Malaysia Super League players
Expatriate footballers in Romania
Liga I players
Serbian footballers
Serbian expatriate footballers
Serbian expatriate sportspeople in Malaysia
Expatriate footballers in Malaysia
CSM Unirea Alba Iulia players
Penang F.C. players
Association football forwards
Expatriate footballers in Lebanon
Homenetmen Beirut footballers
Lebanese Premier League players
Living people
Year of birth missing (living people)